ITA Award for Best Actor - Comedy is an award given by Indian Television Academy as a part of its annual event to a male actor in television series who has delivered an outstanding performance in a comic role.

Winners

References 

best actor comedy
Television awards for Best Actor